Judd Tully is an art critic and journalist who writes about artists and the art market.  He has been  contributor to BlouinARTINFO, The Washington Post, ARTnews, Flash Art and covered topics such as the potential indictment of museum staff in response to Robert Mapplethorpe's 1990 retrospective, and some of the first post-war multi-million dollar auction records.  He is formerly the Editor-at-large for Blouin Artinfo.  He has also appeared on CNBC and MSNBC.

Biography
Judd Tully was born Judd Goldstein in Chicago and attended Lake View High School.  He also attended American University in Washington, DC and went on to pursue a masters at the University of Oregon. He initially got his start writing for underground newspapers and journals in the Bay Area such as the Berkeley Barb.  When Tully moved to New York City around 1972 he began to write freelance art reviews for publications such as the New Art Examiner, Flash Art and SoHo Weekly News eventually becoming a stringer for The Washington Post in 1985. Tully also serves as the Chairman of the Reuben Kadish Foundation. In June 2022, a feature length documentary film about David Hammons, directed by both Tully and Harold Crooks, premiered at the 2022 Sheffield DocFest.

References

External links
 
 
   Judd Tully Archives on artnews.com
   Judd Tully Archives on blouinartinfo.com

Living people
American art critics
American art historians
Cultural historians
Jewish American historians
American male non-fiction writers
Writers from New York (state)
Year of birth missing (living people)
21st-century American Jews